Roger Furman (March 22, 1924 – November 27, 1983) was an American actor, director, playwright, and producer. He was the former founder and owner of New Heritage Repertory Theater, the oldest active theater company in Harlem.  He was also a founder of the Black Theatre Alliance.

Career
He is known for "taking care of business" for black theater.  He had plays that were staged at the Brooklyn Academy of Music.  He was also a founder of the Black Theatre Alliance.  The Roger Furman Theatre (at the Schomburg Center for Research in Black Culture) is named for him.

Furman died in 1983, at his home in Upper Manhattan, aged 59.

Academic
Furman was the author of a book called The Black Book. He taught courses of black drama at New York University, Rutgers, and Hartford University.  The Roger Furman Theatre (at the Schomburg Center for Research in Black Culture) is named after him.

References

1983 deaths
African-American theater directors
American theatre directors